The Getty Tondal, also known as Les visions du chevalier Tondal is an illuminated manuscript from 1475, now in the Getty Museum. It is a French version and is the only surviving fully illuminated manuscript of the Visio Tnugdali. It has 20 miniatures by Simon Marmion and elaborate borders with "CM" for the initials of Margaret of York, Duchess of Burgundy and her husband Charles the Bold. The text was scribed by David Aubert in Ghent, while the miniatures were done in Valenciennes, where Marmion was based. Only the fifteen pages with two-column miniatures and five pages with single column miniatures have borders. There are only 45 folios, meaning that most have miniatures. The manuscript is fully available online.

History

Origin 
The Getty Tondal was commissioned by Margaret of York, Duchess of Burgundy during the 1470s. During this time she had other works she requested or collected for her own personal reading quarters. She was one of the most powerful women of her time period and as such had access to a variety of different methods of attaining manuscripts. She took full advantage of this privilege by commissioning a scribe by the name of David Aubert whose excellent talents in calligraphy can be seen in The Visions of Tondal. Another person who worked on the miniatures in the book is the illuminator Simon Marmion, who was also patronized at this same time by Margaret's husband.

Provenance 
In 1475, Margaret of York, Duchess of Burgundy commissioned the Getty Tondal manuscript in France. She owned it until 1503. In 1853, Charles-Alexandre de Ganay, the Marquis de Ganay, obtained the manuscript and owned it until 1881. It was then owned onwards by Raoul Léonor Lignerolles, comte de Lignerolles, until 1894. The next owner of the Getty Tondal was Joseph Raphaël Vitta, Baron Vitta; he would hold onto it up until 1930 and pass it on to Jean de Brouwer, Baron de Brouwer, a Belgian. It would soon find itself in the hands of an American Hans P. Kraus, Sr. in 1944, having been sold to him via the Librairie FL Tulkens in Brussels.  It was then sold to another American named Philip Hofer in 1951. Hofer passed it off to his son, Dr. Myron Arms Hofer, after his death.  It was sold to the J. Paul Getty Museum in 1987 where it remains today.

Modern Times 

The manuscript can be seen at the J. Paul Getty Museum in person or it can be accessed digitally from the official website for the museum.

Description

Medium 
Tempera colors, gold leaf, gold paint, and ink on parchment tipped into a binding of wood boards covered with brown calfskin.

Contents 

The text of the Visions of Tondal was created in the south German city of Regensburg, where there was an Irish monastery. It was written by a monk who called himself Marcus in the prologue of the story. The prologue states that the work was commissioned by "Abbess G". and indeed, there was an abbess of the Benedictine convent of Saint Paul in Regensberg at this time named Gisela. The monk tells about events that happened during this time that alluding to the possibility that he was an Irish monk and perhaps a visitor to the convent of Saint Paul. Marcus makes reference to two Irish kings that made donations to the monastery of Saint James in The Visions of Tondal; he also tells the reader in Latin the words "de barbarico" translated to "from the Irish" cementing his Irish background.

It was the most widely read of any manuscript predating the story of Dante, which explains why it was translated into major and minor European languages. It was "the most popular and elaborate text in the medieval genre of visionary infernal literature" and had been translated forty-three times into fifteen languages by the 15th century, including Icelandic and Belorussian. It may have been part of the inspiration for Dante's journey into hell, purgatory and heaven.

In the story, Tondal is a wealthy Irish knight who passes out at a feast and goes into a deep dream-journey through Hell, Heaven and Purgatory (never so named – the doctrine was still in development), guided by an angel. The experience turns Tondal into a pious man.  The story is set in Cork, Ireland in 1148, and claims to be a translation of an original in the Irish language, which however has not survived.

Text and Script 
The pages of the manuscript are laid out with a large image on the top of the page accompanied by text that describe the story taking place and the pictures displayed. Script would be written with black ink upon parchment paper. There are large Capitals scattered throughout the pages of the manuscript that break up the large blocks of black text on each page. The script on the page also have intricate boarders around the sides of the pages, these boarders would have parts of it illuminated with gold leaf.

Decoration 
The miniatures shown throughout The Visions of Tondal display a large variety of techniques and use of color to depict the ideas presented in the text. The images of Hell capture the artist's observations of reality in the form of glowing flames with hot red tips over a dark smoky background. Depictions of strange looking monsters fill the landscapes which are full of elegant usage of colors to show not only flames, but also frozen lakes and coldness. Dramatic lighting enhances the effects of the colors and landscapes which in conjunction with the text tell the story in vivid detail. This display of artistic technique flows into the images after Hell, when Tondal gets to images of Paradise the colors shift from bright reds and muted blues towards light blues, whites and vibrant greens presenting a calmer harmonious feel. The images after Hell are less chaotic and simpler; however they visually exhibit a somber, quiet and elegant feel to Paradise, a strong contrast to the hellish images from before strongly reinforcing the ideas of peacefulness and tranquility.

The miniatures
Titles by the Getty, 19/20 listed,:
Tondal Suffers a Seizure at Dinner
Tondal Appears Dead
The Valley of Murderers
The Mountain of Unbelievers and Heretics
The Valley of the Perversely Proud and Presumptuous
The Beast Acheron, Devourer of the Avaricious
The Nail-Studded Bridge for Thieves and Robbers
The House of Phristinus; Punishment for Gluttons and Fornicators
The Beast that Eats Unchaste Priests and Nuns
The Forge of Vulcan; Punishment for Those who Commit Evil upon Evil
Demons Dragging Tondal into the Infernal Cistern
The Gates of Hell and Lucifer
The Wall of Heaven Where the Bad but Not Very Bad Are in Temporary Discomfort
The Good but Not Very Good Are Nourished by a Fountain
Two Kings of Ireland, Former Enemies, Who Made Peace before Death
The Happy Crowds of the Faithfully Married
The Martyrs and the Pure Sing Praises to God
The Glory of Good Monks and Nuns
The Wall of Metals and Jewels surrounding Angels and Saints

Notes

References
 T Kren & S McKendrick (eds), Illuminating the Renaissance: The Triumph of Flemish Manuscript Painting in Europe, Getty Museum/Royal Academy of Arts, pp. 112–116 & passim, 2003, 
 Easting, Robert. Visions of the Other World in Middle English, 1997, Boydell & Brewer,  
 Kren, Thomas, ed. Margaret of York, Simon Marmion, and The Visions of Tondal. Malibu, CA, J. Paul Getty Museum, 1992.
Kren, Thomas and Roger Wieck. The Visions of Tondal from the Library of Margaret of York. Los Angeles, CA: J. Paul Getty Trust, 2012. E-Book.

External links

 The Getty Museum manuscript

Christian illuminated manuscripts
Arts in the court of Philip the Good
Visions du chevalier Tondal, Les
1475 books
1475 in art
15th-century illuminated manuscripts